Sokcho Air Base  is an air base in Sokcho, a city in the Gangwon province of South Korea.

The airport had a single 1,560 meter runway (05/23). It used to serve people who went to Seoraksan for hiking. The airport was closed prior to the opening of Yangyang International Airport.

During the Korean War the USAF designated the base as K-50.

References

External links
 

Airports in South Korea
Sokcho
Buildings and structures in Gangwon Province, South Korea
Korean War air bases